Joseph Kizito (born 2 July 1967) is an Ugandan-born Roman Catholic priest who was appointed as Bishop of the Roman Catholic Diocese of Diwali, in South Africa, on 15 November 2019.

Background and priesthood
Kizito was born on 2 July 1967, in Kampala, Uganda's capital and largest city. He studied Philosophy at St. Augustine’s Major Seminary, in Rom, Lesotho. He then studied Theology at St. John Vianney National Seminary, in Pretoria, South Africa. He was ordained a priest on 27 September 1997, at Aliwal. He served as a priest of Aliwal, South Africa, since. At the time he was appointed Bishop of Aliwal, he was the Vicar General and Parish Priest of Aliwal North Cathedral Parish. Father Kizito had also served as parish vicar of the Saint Francis Xavier parish (1997-1998); parish priest of Saint Augustine’s parish in Rerecord (1998-2003); parish priest of Sterkspruit Catholic Church (2003-2013); vicar general of the diocese of Aliwal (since 2008) and parish priest of Aliwal Cathedral parish (since 2013).

As bishop
On 15 November 2019, Pope Francis appointed Monsignor Joseph Kizito as Bishop of the Roman Catholic Diocese of Aliwal, South Africa. Kizito was ordained as a bishop by Archbishop Stephen Brislin. He replaces Bishop Emeritus Michael Wüstenberg, who served as bishop of the diocese from 2007, until his resignation in 2017.

References

External links
 Website of the Roman Catholic Diocese of Aliwal

1967 births
Ugandan Roman Catholics
21st-century Roman Catholic bishops in South Africa
People from Kampala
Living people
Roman Catholic bishops of Aliwal